The internal capsule is a white matter structure situated in the inferomedial part of each cerebral hemisphere of the brain. It carries information past the basal ganglia, separating the caudate nucleus and the thalamus from the putamen and the globus pallidus. The internal capsule contains both ascending and descending axons, going to and coming from the cerebral cortex. It also separates the caudate nucleus and the putamen in the dorsal striatum, a brain region involved in motor and reward pathways.

The corticospinal tract constitutes a large part of the internal capsule, carrying motor information from the primary motor cortex to the lower motor neurons in the spinal cord. 
Above the basal ganglia the corticospinal tract is a part of the corona radiata. Below the basal ganglia the tract is called cerebral crus (a part of the cerebral peduncle) and below the pons it is referred to as the corticospinal tract.

Structure
The internal capsule consists of three parts and is V-shaped when cut horizontally, in a transverse plane.
 the bend in the V is called the genu
 the anterior limb or crus anterius is the part in front of the genu, between the head of the caudate nucleus and the lenticular nucleus
 the posterior limb or crus posterius is the part behind the genu, between the thalamus and lenticular nucleus
 the retrolenticular portion is caudal to the lenticular nucleus and carries the optic radiation (from medial part of lateral geniculate nucleus) also known as the geniculocalcarine tract. The fiber from lateral part of lateral geniculate nucleus is carried through the retrolenticular portion.
 the sublenticular portion is beneath the lenticular nucleus and are tracts involved in the auditory pathway from the medial geniculate nucleus to the primary auditory cortex (Brodmann areas 41 and 42)

Genu 
The genu is the flexure of the internal capsule. It is formed by fibers from the corticonuclear tracts. The fibers in this region are named the geniculate fibers; they originate in the motor part of the cerebral cortex and after passing downward through the base of the cerebral peduncle with the cerebrospinal fibers, undergo decussation and end in the motor nuclei of the cranial nerves of the opposite side. It contains the corticobulbar tract, which carries upper motor neurons from the motor cortex to cranial nerve nuclei that mainly govern motion of striated muscle in the head and face.

Anterior limb 
The anterior limb of internal capsule (or frontal part) contains: 
 fibers running from the thalamus to the frontal lobe
 fibers connecting the lentiform and caudate nuclei
 fibers connecting the cortex with the corpus striatum
 fibers passing from the frontal lobe through the medial fifth of the base of the cerebral peduncle to the nuclei pontis
 thalamic pontine fibers

Posterior limb 
The posterior limb of internal capsule (or occipital part) is the portion of the internal capsule posterior to the genu.

The anterior two-thirds of the occipital part of the internal capsule contains fibers of the corticospinal tract, which arise in the motor area of the cerebral cortex and, passing downward through the middle three-fifths of the base of the cerebral peduncle, are continued into the pyramids of the medulla oblongata.

The posterior third of the occipital part contains: 
 sensory fibers, largely derived from the thalamus, though some may be continued upward from the medial lemniscus
 the fibers of optic radiation, from the lower visual centers to the cortex of the occipital lobe;
 acoustic fibers, from the lateral lemniscus to the temporal lobe
 fibers that pass from the occipital and temporal lobes to the pontine nuclei

Blood supply 
The superior parts of both the anterior and posterior limbs and the genu of the internal capsule are supplied by the lenticulostriate arteries, which are branches of the M1 segment of the middle cerebral artery.

The inferior half of the anterior limb is supplied via the recurrent artery of Heubner, which is a branch of the anterior cerebral artery.

The inferior half of the posterior limb is supplied by the anterior choroidal artery, which is a branch of the internal carotid artery.

In summary, the blood supply of the internal capsule is

 Anterior limb: lenticulostriate branches of middle cerebral artery (superior half) and recurrent artery of Heubner of the anterior cerebral artery (inferior half)
 Genu: lenticulostriate branches of middle cerebral artery
 Posterior limb: lenticulostriate branches of middle cerebral artery (superior half) and anterior choroidal artery branch of the internal carotid artery (inferior half)

As in many parts of the body, some degree of variation in the blood supply exists. For example, thalamoperforator arteries, which are branches of the basilar artery, occasionally supply the inferior half of the posterior limb.

Function
The internal capsule provides passage to ascending and descending fibres running to and from the cerebral cortex.

Working anterior to posterior:
 The anterior limb of the internal capsule contains:
1) Frontopontine fibers project from frontal cortex to the pons; 
2) Thalamocortical radiations are the fibers that connect the medial and anterior nuclei of the thalamus to the frontal lobes (these are severed during a prefrontal lobotomy).
 The genu contains corticobulbar fibers, which run between the cortex and the brainstem.
 The posterior limb of the internal capsule contains corticospinal fibers, sensory fibers (including the medial lemniscus and the anterolateral system) from the body and a few corticobulbar fibers.

Other fibers within the internal capsule:
 The retrolenticular part contains fibers from the optic system, coming from the lateral geniculate nucleus of the thalamus. More posteriorly, this becomes the optic radiation. Some fibers from the medial geniculate nucleus (which carry auditory information) also pass in the retrolenticular internal capsule, but most are in the sublenticular part.
 The sublenticular part contains fibers connecting with the temporal lobe.  These include the auditory radiations and temporopontine fibers.

Clinical significance
The lenticulostriate arteries supply a substantial amount of the internal capsule. These small vessels are particularly vulnerable to narrowing in the setting of chronic hypertension and can result in small, punctate infarctions or intraparenchymal haemorrhage due to vessel rupture.

Lesions of the genu of the internal capsule affect fibers of the corticobulbar tract.

The primary motor cortex sends its axons through the posterior limb of the internal capsule. Lesions, therefore, result in a contralateral hemiparesis or hemiplegia. While symptoms of weakness due to an isolated lesion of the posterior limb can initially be severe, recovery of motor function is sometimes possible due to spinal projections of premotor cortical regions that are contained more rostrally in the internal capsule.

See also 
 External capsule
 Extreme capsule

References

External links 

 
 
 

Rostral basal ganglia and associated structures